USS Davenport (PF-69), a , was the only ship of the United States Navy to be named for Davenport, Iowa.

Construction
Davenport (PF-69), originally classified as PG-177, was launched on 8 December 1943, by Leathem D. Smith Shipbuilding Company of Sturgeon Bay, Wisconsin, under a Maritime Commission contract, sponsored by Mrs. E. Frick; transferred to the Navy on 1 June 1944, and placed in service the same day; placed out of service for additional work a week later; and commissioned in full on 15 February 1945, with a crew of 215 USCG officers and enlisted men.

Service history
She returned to New York on 24 April, and three days later got underway to escort a convoy to Mers El Kébir, Algeria, returning to Norfolk on 7 June. Two days later she entered the Navy Yard at Charleston, South Carolina, for conversion to a weather ship. This involved removing the number three  gun and installing in its place a hangar used to house meteorological equipment and to inflate and launch weather balloons.

Davenport stood out from Charleston on 26 June 1945, and on 1 July took station off NS Argentia, Newfoundland to report meteorological data.  She remained on this duty until 21 October aside from the period 6 August to 21 during which she towed  to Reykjavík, Iceland.  Arriving at Boston Navy Yard 25 October, Davenport remained there until decommissioned on 4 February 1946.  She was sold 6 June 1946.

References

External links  
 
hazegray.org: USS Davenport
grobbel.org: USS Davenport (PF-69) – WW II Patrol Frigate
 

Tacoma-class frigates
World War II patrol vessels of the United States
Ships built in Sturgeon Bay, Wisconsin
1943 ships
Weather ships